Dakota Mayi Johnson (born October 4, 1989) is an American actress. The daughter of actors Don Johnson and Melanie Griffith, she made her film debut at age ten with a minor role in the dark comedy film Crazy in Alabama (1999) with her mother. After graduating high school, she began auditioning for roles in Los Angeles and was cast in a minor part in The Social Network (2010). Johnson had her breakthrough playing Anastasia Steele in the erotic romantic drama film series Fifty Shades (2015–2018), and received a BAFTA Rising Star Award nomination in 2016.

Johnson appeared in films such as the crime drama Black Mass (2015), Luca Guadagnino's drama A Bigger Splash (2015), the romantic comedy How to Be Single (2016), the supernatural horror film Suspiria (2018), the thriller Bad Times at the El Royale (2018), the coming-of-age film The Peanut Butter Falcon (2019), Maggie Gyllenhaal's psychological drama The Lost Daughter (2021), and Cooper Raiff's Cha Cha Real Smooth (2022).

She has received various awards and nominations, including a People's Choice Award, and nominations for a BAFTA Award and two MTV Movie & TV Awards. She was also featured in Forbes 30 Under 30 list in 2016.

Early life
Dakota Mayi Johnson was born on October 4, 1989, at Brackenridge Hospital in Austin, Texas, to actors Don Johnson and Melanie Griffith. Her father was shooting the film The Hot Spot (1990) in Texas when she was born. Her maternal grandparents are advertising executive and former child actor Peter Griffith and actress Tippi Hedren. She is a niece of actress Tracy Griffith and production designer Clay A. Griffith. Her former stepfather is Spanish actor Antonio Banderas. Johnson has six half-siblings: on her mother’s side, she has one half-brother, Alexander Bauer, and one half-sister, Stella Banderas; on her father’s side, she has three half-brothers—Jesse, Jasper, and Deacon—and one half-sister, Grace Johnson.

Because of her parents' acting work, Johnson spent much of her childhood in various locations with them on film sets and premieres, though she spent extended amounts of time in Aspen and Woody Creek, Colorado, where she worked during summers at the local market as a teenager. In Woody Creek, she was neighbors with Hunter S. Thompson, whom her father was longtime friends with, who would often come to their house in the early morning hours, announcing his presence by discharging a firearm. She attended the Aspen Community School for a time. "I was so consistently unmoored and discombobulated, I didn't have an anchor anywhere," Johnson recalled.  She attended the Santa Catalina School in Monterey, California, for her freshman year of high school before transferring to the private New Roads School in Santa Monica, California.

Johnson became interested in modeling at age twelve after taking part in a photoshoot with other celebrities' children for Teen Vogue, and subsequently earned an income modeling while attending high school in Santa Monica. She has struggled with depression since around age fourteen and checked into rehabilitation. She also has had ADHD since childhood. Johnson was interested in acting as a child, spending significant time on film sets with her parents, but they discouraged her from pursuing the profession until she graduated from high school. After high school, she was turned down by Juilliard in New York City; her audition featured a cover of a Radiohead song.

Career

1999–2014: Beginnings
In 1999, Johnson made her film debut in Crazy in Alabama, where she and her half-sister Stella Banderas played daughters to their real-life mother, Melanie Griffith. The film was directed by her ex-stepfather, Antonio Banderas. In 2006, she was chosen as Miss Golden Globe 2006, where she served as the first second-generation Miss Golden Globe in the Globes' history.

In 2006, Johnson signed with IMG Models. Though acting is her primary work, she has since modeled for MANGO brand's jeans line in 2009 and shot the "Rising Star" campaign for Australian fashion label Wish in 2011.

After graduating from high school, Johnson took acting classes with teacher Tom Todoroff until 2008. She signed with the William Morris Agency and started her acting career. She appeared in a minor role as Amelia Ritter in the Oscar-nominated hit film The Social Network (2010), directed by David Fincher. She had a small role in the fantasy film Beastly (2011), followed by So Yong Kim's drama For Ellen (2012) opposite Paul Dano and Jon Heder, about a struggling musician in the midst of a custody battle. Also in 2012, she had roles in Christopher Neil's independent comedy Goats, portraying a student at a prep school; Nicholas Stoller's romantic comedy The Five-Year Engagement; and the comedy 21 Jump Street. She also played the female lead in Chris Nelson's film Date and Switch written by Alan Yang.

In March 2012, Johnson was cast as Kate in the Fox comedy series Ben and Kate, marking her television debut. The show was canceled on January 25, 2013, after one season. Johnson quickly resumed her film career, with a small role in Need for Speed (2014). In 2013, she had a role as one of the new hires on the series finale episode of the NBC comedy series The Office.

2015–present: Breakthrough
Johnson's breakthrough came with her leading role as Anastasia "Ana" Steele in the erotic romantic drama film Fifty Shades of Grey, which was released in February 2015 and brought her international recognition. Johnson won the role over Lucy Hale, Felicity Jones, Elizabeth Olsen, Danielle Panabaker and Shailene Woodley. In response to questions regarding her stance on gender rights concerning her character in the Fifty Shades film series, Johnson stated: "I'm proud of [the film]. I completely disagree with people who think Ana's weak. I think she's actually stronger than he is. Everything she does is her choice. And if I can be an advocate for women to do what they want to do with their bodies and not be ashamed of what they want, then I'm all for that." While the trilogy was widely criticized, Johnson received praise for often being the standout performer.

On February 15, 2015, Johnson appeared on Saturday Night Lives 40th anniversary special and hosted SNL on February 28, 2015, making her the second daughter of a former SNL host (after Gwyneth Paltrow, whose mother Blythe Danner hosted during the show's seventh season in 1982) to host the show. Also in 2015, she reunited with her 21 Jump Street cast member Johnny Depp, playing the mother of his character's child in the feature film Black Mass. Jessica Kiang of IndieWire said that she "makes something of nothing" in her role. In 2015, Johnson starred in Luca Guadagnino's thriller A Bigger Splash, alongside Tilda Swinton, Matthias Schoenaerts and Ralph Fiennes. Writing for Rolling Stone, Peter Travers stated that Johnson showed that her character "has more on her mind than slithering seductively". According to Christy Lemire from RogerEbert.com: "A Bigger Splash allows Johnson to be both funnier and sexier than she was in Fifty Shades of Grey". The same year saw the release of Cymbeline, a modern film adaptation of the William Shakespeare play, in which she starred opposite Ethan Hawke and Ed Harris. She also played a lead in the 2016 comedy How to Be Single, with Leslie Mann and her Date and Switch co-star Nicholas Braun. She performed a cover of the song "Can't Take My Eyes Off of You", alongside actors Zani Jones Mbayise, Vanessa Rubio and Damon Wayans Jr. for the soundtrack of the film. Johnson was invited to join the Academy of Motion Picture Arts and Sciences in June 2016.

Johnson trained in dance to prepare for Luca Guadagnino's Suspiria (2018), a supernatural horror film and remake of the 1977 film by Dario Argento, in which she plays an American dancer in Berlin who enrolls in an academy run by a coven of witches. David Ehrlich of IndieWire described Johnson's performance in the film as "thrillingly unrepentant". Also in 2018, she starred in Drew Goddard's neo-noir thriller Bad Times at the El Royale, with Jeff Bridges, Jon Hamm and Chris Hemsworth. In the film, she plays a hippie staying at a resort on the California-Nevada border where the lives of various people with suspicious pasts intersect. Screen Rant ranked Johnson's performance as the fourth-best in the film and stated that "she brings a reserved, under-the-surface power to her role".

In 2019, Johnson starred in the psychological horror film, Wounds, opposite Armie Hammer, directed by Babak Anvari, based upon a horror novella The Visible Filth by Nathan Ballingrud. It had its world premiere at the Sundance Film Festival on January 26, 2019. She then starred in the well-reviewed independent adventure film, The Peanut Butter Falcon, opposite Shia LaBeouf and Bruce Dern, which had its world premiere at South by Southwest on March 9, 2019. She appeared in the drama film Our Friend, opposite Casey Affleck and Jason Segel, and directed by Gabriela Cowperthwaite. The film is based upon real life couple Nicole and Matthew Teague, faced with Nicole's impending death, see their best friend move in with them to help them out. She sang on  three covers of songs for the film's soundtrack, including one of "If I Had the World to Give" by Grateful Dead. Joe Morgenstern of The Wall Street Journal wrote that the "intimacy of Ms. Johnson's performance is extraordinary. She is the least assertive of movie stars, yet the courage, despair and fury she finds in Nicole will lift you up and spin you around". While Gary Goldstein from the Los Angeles Times stated that Johnson "impresses with affecting range — from flirty, ebullient and adoring to stalwart, enraged and resigned; it's a lovely performance".

Johnson founded the production company TeaTime Pictures, alongside former Netflix development executive Ro Donnelly, to develop film and television projects. In 2020, Johnson made her directorial debut, co-directing (with Cory Bailey) the music video for Coldplay's "Cry Cry Cry", which featured her boyfriend Chris Martin. Johnson starred alongside Tracee Ellis Ross in the dramedy film The High Note, which was released on May 29, 2020. Her performance received mostly lukewarm reviews as Ann Hornaday of The Washington Post wrote that "she's lovely to look at and can never be accused of overacting, but in terms of conveying single-minded drive, Johnson is no match for [Tracee Ellis] Ross's carefully calibrated tonal swings between imperiousness, self-awareness, isolation and down-to-earth intimacy." Conversely Richard Roeper of the Chicago Sun Times saw it as "maybe her best and certainly most lovable performance." In 2021, she co-starred in The Lost Daughter directed by Maggie Gyllenhaal, based on the novel of the same name by Elena Ferrante. In 2022, she starred in a Netflix adaptation of author Jane Austen's Persuasion, Am I Ok? by Stephanie Allyne and Tig Notaro, and as a young mother in Cha Cha Real Smooth by Cooper Raiff.

Upcoming projects
In 2019, it was announced that she was set to star in Daddio directed by Christy Hall and in Crackpot for director Elaine May. Additionally, Johnson signed on to star and produce Rodeo Queens, a mockumentary series directed by Carrie Brownstein for Amazon Studios.

Johnson will serve as an executive producer on several films under TeaTime Pictures. She will produce and star in Forever, Interrupted, in which she will play a young widow, Unfit, in which she will portray Carrie Buck in a fact-based 1920s courtroom drama based on the non-fiction book Imbeciles: The Supreme Court, American Eugenics, and the Sterilization of Carrie Buck by Adam Cohen, and Queens of the Stoned Age, based on the GQ article by Suketu Mehta. Additionally, she will star and produce the miniseries Cult Following.

In December 2021, Boat Rocker Media acquired a minority interest in Johnson's TeaTime Pictures company.

In February 2022, Johnson was cast as Madame Web in the upcoming superhero film of the same name, set in Sony's Spider-Man Universe.

Other ventures 
In November 2020, it was announced that she had become an investor and co-creative director of Maude, a sexual wellness brand.

Personal life
Johnson was previously involved in long-term relationships with her childhood sweetheart, musician Noah Gersh and actor Jordan Masterson. She dated Matthew Hitt, the lead vocalist of Welsh indie rock band Drowners, intermittently for almost two years until 2016. She has been in a relationship with Coldplay's vocalist Chris Martin since October 2017. They reside in Malibu, California.

Johnson is a tattoo enthusiast and has been named a brand ambassador for luxury fashion brand Gucci. In 2023, she appeared in an advertisement campaign for Gucci promoting their leather handbags. Later, the People for the Ethical Treatment of Animals, a non-profit organization for animal welfare, called on her to reconsider her ambassadorship for Gucci as these products were produced from Python and Alligator leather, which is illegal in California. 

In 2018, she collaborated with 300 women in Hollywood to set up the Time's Up initiative to protect women from harassment and discrimination.

Filmography

Film

Television

Music video

Awards and nominations

Among her accolades, Johnson received the Robert Altman Award from the Independent Spirit Awards as a part of the ensemble for Suspiria. For her work in the Fifty Shades film series, she received a People's Choice Award, as well as nomination for two MTV Movie & TV Awards. She was nominated for BAFTA Rising Star Award in 2016.

References

External links

 
 
 

1989 births
20th-century American actresses
21st-century American actresses
Actresses from Austin, Texas
American child actresses
American film actresses
American people of Norwegian descent
American people of Swedish descent
American people of German descent
American people of English descent
American television actresses
Living people
Female models from Texas
Griffith family